"Bringing It Back" is a 1975 song by Elvis Presley.

Bringing It Back may also refer to:

 "Bringing It Back" (Digga D and AJ Tracey song), released in 2021
 Bringin' It Back, a 2004 album by Blake Aaron 
 Bringin' It Back!, a 2004 album by David Marez, nominated for the 2005 Tejano Music Award for Album of the Year
 "Bringing It Back", a 1972 song on the album Naturally by J.J. Cale